Pitcairnia microcalyx is a species of flowering plant in the Bromeliaceae family. This species is endemic to Venezuela.

References

microcalyx
Flora of Venezuela
Taxa named by John Gilbert Baker